Yasushi Imamura (born 30 January 1890, date of death unknown) was a Japanese equestrian. He competed in the individual jumping event at the 1932 Summer Olympics.

References

1890 births
Year of death missing
Japanese male equestrians
Olympic equestrians of Japan
Equestrians at the 1932 Summer Olympics
Place of birth missing